The QI Book of the Dead (sold as The Book of the Dead in the United States) is the fourth title in a series of books based on the intellectual British panel game QI, written by series-creator John Lloyd and head-researcher John Mitchinson. It is a book of "quite interesting" obituaries.

Publication history
The QI Book of the Dead was first published by Faber and Faber in hardback on 5 November 2009. The idea of the book originated before the television series QI was broadcast. Mitchinson wrote in an article for the Daily Telegraph newspaper that, "It first appeared on one of our "how to make life more interesting" lists at a time when Stephen Fry's erudite put-downs and the anteater impressions of Alan Davies weren't even gleams in Lloyd's eye."

Structure
The book is divided into 10 chapters, covering 68 different people. However, instead of dividing the chapters into subjects normally found in such books, like "Royalty", "Scientists" and "Sportsmen", The QI Book of the Dead uses "more diverting categories". Examples include "There's Nothing Like a Bad Start in Life", covering people who had bad childhoods; "Man Cannot Live by Bread Alone", about people with unusual diets; and "Is That All There Is?" about people interested in life after death.

Reception
Ian Wolf for the British Comedy Guide was mostly positive with his review, saying: "The QI Book of the Dead is definitely an enjoyable read, and makes for a great gift idea. For one thing, it allows us to look back and learn on the mistakes of our ancestors. Amongst those ancestors are Confucius and Nefertiti, whom everyone in the world is related to... interesting, isn't it!"

However, Wolf also wrote that the book made mistakes. He wrote that the book wrongly claimed that Lord Shelburne was Prime Minister, when in fact he was First Lord of the Treasury, with the title of "Prime Minister" not being used to describe the leader of the British government until a century after Shelburne died by Henry Campbell-Bannerman.

Obituaries
The people covered in The QI Book of the Dead are as follows.

References

Further reading
 Lloyd, John and Mitchinson, John. The QI Book of the Dead. London: Faber and Faber. 5 November 2009. 

Books based on QI
Trivia books
British non-fiction books
Books by John Lloyd (producer)
2009 non-fiction books
Faber and Faber books